Martin Kuciak (born 15 March 1982) is a Slovak football goalkeeper who last played for Slovak third division team of MŠK Považská Bystrica.

He is the elder brother of Lechia Gdańsk and ex-Slovakia goalkeeper Dušan Kuciak.

Club career
Martin Kuciak is a product of Žilina youth academy.

MŠK Rimavská Sobota
After a spell at Kysucké Nové Mesto, Kuciak joined Rimavská Sobota in summer 2005, who had been relegated from the Slovak top flight the previous season. He became the number one goalkeeper at the club in the spring part of the 2007-2008 season.

FC ViOn Zlaté Moravce
Kuciak transferred to the Corgoň liga club ViOn Zlaté Moravce in the winter break of the 2009-2010 season. In the following four and a half years at Zlaté Moravce, he played in every single competitive game. Despite his success at the club, Kuciak decided not to renew his contract and left Zlaté Moravce after it expired in summer 2014.

FC Hradec Králové
Shortly afterwards, Kuciak signed for the Synot liga club Hradec Králové. He made his debut for Hradec Králové in a 1-0 league loss to Příbram on 4 October 2014. He was mostly used as a back-up goalkeeper behind Tomáš Koubek. Kuciak was relegated with the club at the end of the season.

FO ŽP Šport Podbrezová
Kuciak came to Podbrezová in the summer of 2015. He made his competitive debut for the club in a 2-0 league loss to AS Trenčín on 25 July 2015.
In January 2019, he joined Slavia Prague.

References

External links
 
 Player profile at zpfutbal.sk 
 
 

1982 births
Living people
Slovak footballers
Slovak expatriate footballers
Association football goalkeepers
MŠK Rimavská Sobota players
FC ViOn Zlaté Moravce players
FC Hradec Králové players
FK Železiarne Podbrezová players
SK Slavia Prague players
FC Nitra players
Slovak Super Liga players
Czech First League players
Sportspeople from Žilina
Slovak expatriate sportspeople in the Czech Republic
Expatriate footballers in the Czech Republic